Armin Niederer (born 28 February 1987) is a Swiss freestyle skier who specializes in the skicross discipline.

He made his World Cup debut in January 2007 in Flaine, with a 27th place. He then won a bronze medal at the 2007 Junior World Championships. He finished among the top twenty for the first time in February 2008, with an eighteenth place in Sierra Nevada. In the 2008–09 season he finished among the top twenty in three of his first four races, with the best result being an eleventh place in Lake Placid in January.

He uses Fischer Skis.

References

External links
 
 
 
 
 

1987 births
Living people
Swiss male freestyle skiers
Freestyle skiers at the 2014 Winter Olympics
Freestyle skiers at the 2018 Winter Olympics
Olympic freestyle skiers of Switzerland
21st-century Swiss people